Admiral of the Fleet Bruce Austin Fraser, 1st Baron Fraser of North Cape,  (5 February 1888 – 12 February 1981) was a senior Royal Navy officer. He served in the First World War, saw action during the Gallipoli Campaign and took part in the internment of the German High Seas Fleet at the end of the war. He also served in the Second World War initially as Third Sea Lord and Controller of the Navy and then as second-in-command and afterwards as commander of the Home Fleet, leading the force that destroyed the German battleship . He went on to be First Sea Lord and Chief of the Naval Staff in which role he assisted in establishing NATO and agreed to the principle that the Supreme Allied Commander Atlantic should be an American admiral, in the face of fierce British opposition.

Early naval career
Born the son of General Alexander Fraser and Monica Stores Fraser (née Smith), Fraser was educated at Bradfield College. He joined the Royal Navy as a cadet in the training ship HMS Britannia in September 1902 and passed out as a midshipman in the battleship  in the Channel Fleet on 15 January 1904. He transferred to the battleship  in the Channel Fleet in February 1905 and, having been promoted to sub-lieutenant on 15 March 1907, he joined the battleship  in May 1907. He moved to the destroyer HMS Gypsy in September 1907 and, having been promoted to lieutenant on 15 March 1908, he joined the cruiser  in the Mediterranean Fleet.

Fraser transferred to the Home Fleet in August 1910 and remained there serving in  until July 1911 when he joined , the Royal Navy's school of Gunnery at Whale Island in Portsmouth harbour where he commenced the 'long course' to qualify as a specialist Gunnery Officer. He assisted on the Advanced Gunnery Course at the Royal Naval College, Greenwich, in 1912 and then joined the instructing staff at HMS Excellent in 1913.

Fraser served in the First World War, initially in the cruiser  providing naval gunfire support during the Gallipoli Campaign and then carrying troops to protect Egypt's Western frontier. He returned to HMS Excellent early in 1916 and, having been promoted to lieutenant commander on 15 March 1916, he joined the battleship  as Gunnery Officer at the end of the year. He spent the remainder of the War with the Grand Fleet and took part in the internment of the German High Seas Fleet in November 1918.

After the war and following his promotion to commander on 30 June 1919 and his appointment as an Officer of the Order of the British Empire on 17 July 1919, Fraser volunteered to serve with the White Russian Caspian Flotilla; however on arrival in Azerbaijan as part of the 1920 Royal Navy Mission to Enzeli, he was captured and imprisoned by Bolsheviks in the Black Hole of Baku until released in November 1920. He then returned to HMS Excellent before joining the Naval Ordnance Department at the Admiralty in June 1922. He became Fleet Gunnery Officer for the Mediterranean Fleet in December 1924 and, having been promoted to captain on 30 June 1926, he became Head of the Tactical Division of the Admiralty in January 1927. He was appointed to command the cruiser  on the East Indies Station in September 1929 and then became Director of the Naval Ordnance Department at the Admiralty in July 1933.

Fraser returned to sea to take command of the aircraft carrier  in May 1936 and then became Chief Staff Officer to the Flag Officer Aircraft Carriers in 1937. He reached Flag rank as a rear admiral on 11 January 1938 and was made Chief of Staff to the Commander-in-Chief Mediterranean Fleet in April 1938. He was appointed Companion of the Order of the Bath in the 1939 New Year Honours.

Second World War
In March 1939, shortly before the outset of the Second World War, Fraser was appointed Third Sea Lord and Controller of the Navy. Promoted to vice admiral on 8 May 1940, he was advanced to Knight Commander of the Order of the British Empire in the 1941 Birthday Honours and became second-in-command, Home Fleet and Flag Officer, 2nd Battle Squadron, in June 1942. He was appointed a Grand Officer of the Dutch Order of Orange-Nassau on 19 January 1943.

Fraser was appointed Commander-in-Chief of the Home Fleet in May 1943 and appointed a Knight Commander of the Order of the Bath in the 1943 Birthday Honours. In the role of Commander-in-Chief of the Home Fleet, he commanded the Royal Navy force that destroyed the German battleship Scharnhorst at the Battle of the North Cape on 26 December 1943. Units of the Home Fleet regularly escorted convoys to Murmansk in the Soviet Union: Fraser was convinced that Scharnhorst would attempt an attack on Convoy JW 55B, and put to sea in his flagship  to reach a position between the convoy and the German battleship's base in North Norway. Scharnhorst had her fighting ability destroyed by repeated hits from Duke of York and her speed reduced by a 14-inch shell hit to a boiler room, which deprived her of the ability to escape. She was then hit by an initial wave of four torpedoes and, after concentrated gunfire and further torpedo attacks, sank at 7.45 pm that night. Thus Fraser avenged the destruction of his old command, HMS Glorious, by Scharnhorst three years earlier. After the action Fraser and his fleet returned to Murmansk for refuelling.

For this action he was advanced to Knight Grand Cross of the Order of the Bath on 5 January 1944, and awarded the Russian Order of Suvorov, First Degree on 25 February.

Promoted to full admiral on 7 February 1944, Fraser took command of the Eastern Fleet in August 1944 and then of the British Pacific Fleet in December 1944. He commanded from ashore at his Headquarters in Sydney in Australia and built a strong relationship with the United States Navy, adopting their system of signal communications. Fraser was the British signatory to the Japanese Instrument of Surrender at Tokyo Bay on 2 September 1945.

Later career

On 27 April 1946 Fraser was appointed First and Principal Naval Aide-de-Camp to the King and, in September, he was raised to the peerage as Baron Fraser of North Cape, of Molesey in the County of Surrey. He became Commander-in-Chief, Portsmouth in September 1947 and then, having been promoted to Admiral of the Fleet on 7 February 1948, he became First Sea Lord and Chief of the Naval Staff in September. As First Sea Lord he assisted in establishing NATO and agreed to the principle that the Supreme Allied Commander Atlantic (SACLANT) should be an American admiral, in the face of fierce British opposition. He retired in December 1951 and died, unmarried, in London on 12 February 1981, one week after his birthday at the age of 93, upon which the barony became extinct.

References

Sources

Further reading

External links

  Transcription of Official Service Records on www.admirals.org.uk
 
 

|-

|-

|-

|-

|-

1888 births
1981 deaths
People from Ealing
People educated at Bradfield College
First Sea Lords and Chiefs of the Naval Staff
Lords of the Admiralty
Royal Navy admirals of the fleet
Royal Navy admirals of World War II
Knights Grand Cross of the Order of the Bath
Knights Commander of the Order of the British Empire
Grand Officers of the Order of Orange-Nassau
Recipients of the Order of Suvorov, 1st class
Chevaliers of the Légion d'honneur
Recipients of the Croix de Guerre 1939–1945 (France)
Grand Crosses of the Order of the Dannebrog
Recipients of the Navy Distinguished Service Medal
Royal Navy personnel of the Russian Civil War
Royal Navy officers of World War I
Admiralty personnel of World War II
Barons created by George VI
Military personnel from London